Kafr Nasij (also spelled Kafar Nasej) is a village in the al-Sanamayn District of the Daraa Governorate in southern Syria. Nearby localities include al-Tiha to the west, Aqraba and al-Harra to the southwest, Zimrin to the south, Kafr Shams to the southeast, Deir al-Adas to the east and Kanakir to the north. In the 2004 census by the Central Bureau of Statistics (CBS), Kafr Nasij had a population of 2,381.

History
A Ghassanid monastery of stylites was located in Kafr Nasij which was part of Batanea during the Byzantine era (4th-7th centuries).

Ottoman era
In 1596 Kafr Nasij appeared in the Ottoman tax registers being in the nahiya of Jaydur, part of Hauran Sanjak. It had an entirely  Muslim population consisting  of 17 households and 7 bachelors. They paid a fixed tax-rate of 40% on agricultural products, including  wheat, barley, summer crops, goats, bee-hives and water mills; in addition to occasional revenues; a total of 17,800 akçe.

In 1838, Kefr Nasij was noted as a village in the el-Jeidur district.

Modern era
During the ongoing Syrian Civil War which began in 2011, pro-government media reported that five opposition rebels were killed and 13 others arrested during a clash with Syrian security forces.

Climate
In Kafr Nasij, there is a Mediterranean climate. Rainfall is higher in winter than in summer. The Köppen-Geiger climate classification is Csa. About  of precipitation falls annually.

References

Bibliography

External links
 Map of town, Google Maps
 Sanameine-map, 19L

Populated places in Al-Sanamayn District